Alondes Williams (born June 19, 1999) is an American professional basketball player for the Long Island Nets of the NBA G League. He played college basketball for the Triton Trojans, the Oklahoma Sooners, and the Wake Forest Demon Deacons.

High school career
Williams played basketball for Riverside University High School in Milwaukee, Wisconsin, where he was coached by Tyrone Lewis. Williams averaged 12.3 points per game as a senior.

College career
As a freshman at Triton College, Williams averaged 13.8 points and 6.3 rebounds per game, earning First Team All-North Central Community College Conference (N4C) accolades. His team won the National Junior College Athletic Association (NJCAA) Division II title before moving to the NJCAA Division I in the following year. In his sophomore season, Williams averaged 17 points, 7.7 rebounds and 5.3 assists per game, and was named N4C Player of the Year. He transferred to Oklahoma for his junior season, and averaged six points and 1.9 rebounds per game. As a senior, Williams averaged 6.7 points and 2.8 rebounds per game. He opted to use an additional year of eligibility and transferred to Wake Forest. On December 11, 2021, Williams posted the second triple-double in program history, with 16 points, 14 rebounds and 10 assists in a 79–53 win against USC Upstate. In his next game, three days later, he scored a career-high 36 points in a 77–70 victory over VMI. Williams was named ACC Player of the Year.

Professional career

Brooklyn Nets (2022–2023)
After being undrafted in the 2022 NBA draft, on July 4, 2022, Williams signed a two-way contract with the Brooklyn Nets of the National Basketball Association (NBA). He was waived by the Nets on January 12, 2023.

Long Island Nets (2023–present)
On January 18, 2023, Williams was reacquired by the Long Island Nets.

Career statistics

NBA

Regular Season

|-
| style="text-align:left;"|
| style="text-align:left;"|Brooklyn
| 1 || 0 || 5.0 ||  ||  ||  || 1.0 || .0 || .0 || .0 || .0

College

NCAA Division I

|-
| style="text-align:left;"|2019–20
| style="text-align:left;"|Oklahoma
| 31 || 10 || 16.6 || .438 || .283 || .636 || 1.9 || .6 || .4 || .1 || 6.0
|-
| style="text-align:left;"|2020–21
| style="text-align:left;"|Oklahoma
| 24 || 14 || 18.5 || .481 || .167 || .839 || 2.8 || 1.3 || .7 || .3 || 6.7
|-
| style="text-align:left;"|2021–22
| style="text-align:left;"|Wake Forest
| 35 || 35 || 34.1 || .507 || .282 || .691 || 6.4 || 5.2 || 1.2 || .4 || 18.5
|- class="sortbottom"
| style="text-align:center;" colspan="2"|Career
| 90 || 59 || 23.9 || .488 || .270 || .699 || 3.9 || 2.6 || .8 || .2 || 11.1

NJCAA

|-
| style="text-align:left;"|2017–18
| style="text-align:left;"|Triton
| 36 ||  ||  || .577 || .376 ||  || 6.3 || 2.7 ||  ||  || 13.8
|-
| style="text-align:left;"|2018–19
| style="text-align:left;"|Triton
| 33 || 32 || 21.7 || .504 || .404 || .701 || 7.7 || 5.3 || 1.8 || 1.0 || 17.0
|- class="sortbottom"
| style="text-align:center;" colspan="2"|Career
| 69 ||  ||  ||  ||  ||  ||  ||  ||  ||  ||

References

External links

 Triton Trojans bio
 Oklahoma Sooners bio
 Wake Forest Demon Deacons bio

1999 births
Living people
American men's basketball players
Basketball players from Milwaukee
Brooklyn Nets players
Junior college men's basketball players in the United States
Long Island Nets players
Oklahoma Sooners men's basketball players
Point guards
Shooting guards
Triton College alumni
Undrafted National Basketball Association players
Wake Forest Demon Deacons men's basketball players